The term Schatz can refer to:

An ornamental or occupational German surname meaning "treasure" or "treasury" (as a town treasurer)
A term of endearment in German-speaking countries, comparable to "honey" or "darling" in English
The futures contract listed on Eurex with this two-year debt as the underlying.

The term Shatz (pronounced the same way as Schatz) can refer to:
The Yiddish name of a city Suceava in Europe

Surnames
People with the surname Schatz or variants include:
Aaron Schatz, NFL analyst
Albert Schatz (disambiguation)
Avner Shats, Israeli author
Boris Schatz, founder of Bezalel Academy
Brian Schatz, American politician, representing Hawaii in the U.S. Senate
Carla J. Shatz, American neurobiologist
Carsten Schatz (born 1970), German politician (Die Linke)
Donny Schatz, sprint car driver
George C. Schatz, American theoretical chemist
Gottfried Schatz, Swiss-Austrian biochemist
Henry L. Schatz, German American agriculture attaché, involved in Canadian Caper
Herman Schatz, American blacksmith and politician
Howard Schatz, American photographer
Ilene Kristen (born Ilene Schatz), American actress
Jerry Tucker (actor) (born Jerome H. Schatz), American actor
Leslie Shatz, American sound engineer
Louise Schatz (1916–1997), Canadian-born Israeli artist and designer
Lydia Schatz, Liberian-American girl, killed by her own parents
Mark Schatz, musician
Mike Schatz, American creative director, copywriter, and voice actor 
Mikhail Shats
Paul Schatz (1898–1979), sculptor, inventor and mathematician
Roman Schatz, German-born Finnish television presenter and writer
Ruta Šaca-Marjaša (Ruta Maksovna Shats-Mariash)
Shaul Shats, Israeli painter
Warren Schatz, American producer, arranger and orchestra conductor
Zahara Schatz, Israeli artist

See also
 Schatz-Walzer (Treasure Waltz)

German-language surnames
Jewish surnames